Gallinipper was a schooner that sank in Lake Michigan off the coast of Centerville, Manitowoc County, Wisconsin, United States. In 2010, the shipwreck site was added to the National Register of Historic Places.

Service history

Nancy Dousman
Originally named Nancy Dousman, the ship was built in 1833 by Augustus Jones and G. W. Cochran on the Black River in Ohio, for Michael Dousman, the western agent for John Jacob Astor's American Fur Company. Named for Dousman's daughter Nancy, Nancy Dousman  carried goods from the eastern United States to the Wisconsin Territory frontier and returned with furs from the frontier for markets in the eastern United States. Nancy Dousman also carried employees of the American Fur Company and other passengers, including immigrants who settled the Wisconsin Territory's frontier. In addition to his work for the fur company, Dousman established a warehouse, gristmill, and sawmill at Milwaukee, Wisconsin Territory, in 1835, and he used Nancy Dousman to bring supplies to Milwaukee and transport grain to markets in the eastern United States.

Nancy Dousman was sold to new owners a number of times. She ran aground at least twice, but was refloated each time.

Gallinipper

In 1846, shipwright Henry Gibson rebuilt the ship at Milwaukee, increasing her cargo capacity. Renamed Gallinipper, she returned to service, based at Milwaukee and engaged in transporting cargoes of lumber. She again was sold and resold, and experienced a number of mishaps, sinking at Beaver Island in Lake Michigan on July 7, 1848, running aground at Milwaukee in 1850; and sinking at the mouth of the Milwaukee River in May 1851. She was refloated and returned to service each time.

She righted herself, but then capsized again, and her crew and passengers abandoned ship and were rescued by the schooner Cleopatra. Waterlogged, Gallinipper became mostly submerged, but did not sink. The schooner Crook sighted her on 9 July 1851 and reported her to be nearly underwater. Despite a search for her by her captain, she was not found again and was presumed to have sunk. Valued at USD$3,000 and insured for USD$2,000, she was declared a total loss.

Wreck

The wreck remained unidentified until a 2009 archaeological survey of it  by the Wisconsin Historical Society. On December 28, 2010, the shipwreck site was placed on the National Register of Historic Places. The wreck was included within the boundaries of the Wisconsin Shipwreck Coast National Marine Sanctuary when it was created in 2021.

Gallinipper′s wreck is the oldest known shipwreck in Wisconsin's waters. It is a rare example of an early Great Lakes trading schooner. Few trading schooners were built for service on the western Great Lakes, and little other evidence of them remains, despite their importance in maintaining trade and communication among frontier communities on the Great Lakes and between them and cities in the eastern United States.

It sits upright on the lake bottom with its bow slightly higher than its stern and with a 20-degree list to starboard. The hull is intact and covered by silt and mussels. The standing rigging has been damaged by fishing nets snagging on it and efforts by fishermen to free the nets, resulting in the mainmast being pulled from the mast step and toppling forward so that it rests at an angle over the bow, the foremast breaking loose from the hull and coming to the surface, and most of the rest of the rigging—including a boom, gaff, topmast, and two yards—being deposited on the lake floor to starboard of the wreck. Fishing net is wrapped around the stern, runs along the lake bed on either side of the hull, and is draped over the mainmast and forward deck.

Gallinipper′s foremast is on display at the Rogers Street Fishing Village in Two Rivers, Wisconsin.

References

Shipwrecks on the National Register of Historic Places in Wisconsin
Shipwrecks of the Wisconsin coast
1833 ships
Ships built in Ohio
Shipwrecks of Lake Michigan
Maritime incidents in 1848
Maritime incidents in 1850
Maritime incidents in 1851
National Register of Historic Places in Manitowoc County, Wisconsin
Wreck diving sites in the United States